Oglala are one of the seven subtribes of the Lakota people who, along with the Dakota, make up the Očhéthi Šakówiŋ (Seven Council Fires).

Oglala  may also refer to:

 Oglala, South Dakota, a town
 Oglala Dam, South Dakota
 Oglala National Grassland, Nebraska
 Ogallala Aquifer, an aquifer or concentration of groundwater in the U.S. Midwest
 USS Oglala (CM-4), a U.S. Navy minelayer sunk in the attack on Pearl Harbor
 Oglala (crater), Mars

See also
Incident at Oglala, a documentary film about a shooting incident
Oglala Lakota College, Pine Ridge Indian Reservation, South Dakota
Oglala Lakota County, South Dakota